The southern toad (Anaxyrus terrestris) is a true toad native to the southeastern United States, from eastern Louisiana and southeastern Virginia south to Florida. It often lives in areas with sandy soils. It is nocturnal and spends the day in a burrow. Its coloring is usually brown but can be red, gray, or black. It is approximately 8 cm (3 inches) long.

Description
The most obvious distinguishing feature is the knobs on the head and the backward-pointing spurs that extends as far as the paratoid glands. The dorsal surface is covered with warts, some of which may be spiny. The color of the head, back and sides varies from brick red to mottled grey, brown and black while the underparts are pale, sometimes with dark spots on the chest.

Distribution
The southern toad is found on the coastal plain of the southeastern United States. Its range extends from southern Virginia to Florida and Louisiana and there are two isolated populations on the Piedmont plateau and the Blue Ridge Mountains in South Carolina.

Behavior
The southern toad is nocturnal and lives in a burrow by day, or sometimes hides under a log or pile of debris. It occurs in woodland in cultivated land and gardens and sometimes stands beneath outdoor lights at night to pick up the attracted insects that fall to the ground. A 2006 study found that there was no difference in the number of toads found in wooded and clearcut area, but there was a difference in the survival rates which was much higher in wooded area. In winter it may become inactive and remain in its burrow for extended periods.

Breeding starts in spring when the males migrate from their upland habitats to the lowland pools, ditches,  swamps and the margins of lakes where they breed. The breeding season typically occurs between the first of March into late May although it will occasionally continue up until September. Heavy rain triggers large numbers of males to congregate and call, forming choruses. Each female lays a clutch of up to 4,000 eggs and the water may be thick with spawn. The tadpoles feed on algae which they scrape from underwater vegetation. Adults are carnivorous and feed on any small invertebrates they can find.

Status
The southern toad has a wide range and is common in much of that range, though it has become scarce in Florida in areas where the cane toad has become established. In general it is an adaptable species and faces no particular threats, the population seems stable and the IUCN has listed it as being of "least concern". Southern toads are sometimes exploited by the pet trade.

Gallery

References

Further reading
 (2004) The history of a Nearctic colonization: Molecular phylogenetics and biogeography of the Nearctic toads (Bufo). Evolution 58: 2517–2535.

External links

USGS: Southern Toad
VDGIF: Southern Toad

Anaxyrus
Toad, Southern
Toad, Southern
Endemic fauna of the United States
Amphibians described in 1802